Garia Main Road is an important thoroughfare in South suburban areas of Kolkata. The road runs from Garia crossing in the north to Kamalgazi in the south (part of Netaji Subhash Chandra Bose Road). It carries a considerable amount of traffic throughout the day and is a major gateway to downtown Kolkata for the localities of Narendrapur, Rajpur-Sonarpur, Harinavi, Baruipur etc.

See also

Roads in Kolkata